

<div id="31_August_2007"> </div id>

31 August 2007 (Friday)

Basketball:
Philippine NCAA basketball tournament 2007
Juniors:  98–96 
Seniors:  87–84 
After the second game, Letran players and San Beda supporters engaged in a brawl at the Araneta Coliseum (ABS-CBN News)

<div id="30_August_2007"> </div id>

30 August 2007 (Thursday)

American football:
NCAA Division I Top 25:
(2) LSU 45, Mississippi State 0
(10) Louisville 73, Murray State 10
(16) Rutgers 38, Buffalo 3
(24) Boise State 56, Weber State 7
Basketball:
FIBA Americas Championship 2007 quarterfinals at Las Vegas
Uruguay and Canada are eliminated from contention, although Canada qualifies for the pre-Olympic qualifying tournament.

<div id="29_August_2007"> </div id>

29 August 2007 (Wednesday)

Basketball:
FIBA Americas Championship 2007 quarterfinals at Las Vegas
Mexico and Venezuela are eliminated from contention.
Football (soccer)
2007 SuperLiga finals at The Home Depot Center, Carson, California
Los Angeles Galaxy 1–1 C.F. Pachuca, C.F. Pachuca wins 4–3 on penalties

<div id="28_August_2007"> </div id>

28 August 2007 (Tuesday)

Basketball:
FIBA Americas Championship 2007 quarterfinals at Las Vegas

<div id="27_August_2007"> </div id>

27 August 2007 (Monday)

National Football League:
Bad Newz Kennels dog fighting investigation: Michael Vick pleads guilty to federal dog fighting charges and apologizes to fans. (AP via Yahoo)
Major League Baseball:
In a complete housecleaning, the Houston Astros fire both manager Phil Garner and General Manager Tim Purpura.  Cecil Cooper will take over as manager for the remainder of the season and team president Tal Smith will add interim GM duties until a replacement is named. Smith was previously Astros General Manager from 1975 through 1980. (Houston Chronicle)
The Cleveland Indians turn a 5–4–3 triple play in the seventh inning of their 8–3 win over the Minnesota Twins. It's the Indians' first triple play since 1992 and first on a ground ball since 1981. (AP via Yahoo)
Basketball:
FIBA Americas Championship 2007 quarterfinals at Las Vegas
Argentina and USA secured berths for the semifinals.

<div id="26_August_2007"> </div id>

26 August 2007 (Sunday)

Football (soccer)
2007 ONGC Nehru Cup at India
 3–0 
The 2007–08 Serie "A" season begins in Italy.
Auto racing:
Formula One: Turkish Grand Prix in Istanbul, Turkey.
(1) Felipe Massa  (2) Kimi Räikkönen  (3) Fernando Alonso 
Champ Car: Belgian Champ Car Grand Prix in Heusden-Zolder, Belgium.
(1) Sébastien Bourdais  (2) Bruno Junqueira  (3) Graham Rahal 
IRL: Motorola Indy 300 in Sonoma, California.
(1) Scott Dixon  (2) Hélio Castroneves  (3) Dario Franchitti 
Cricket
South African cricket team in Zimbabwe in 2007
 323/9 (50 ov.) beat  295/7 (50 ov.) by 28 runs
 win the series 3–0.
2007–08 ICC Intercontinental Cup
 524/8 (dec) beat  192 & 186 by an innings and 146 runs
Points: Ireland 20, Bermuda 0.
Baseball
2007 Little League World Series Championship Game
 Warner Robins, Georgia 3,  Tokyo Kitasuna 2 (8 innings)
Basketball
FIBA Americas Championship 2007 at Las Vegas
Panama and The Virgin Islands are eliminated from the tournament.

<div id="25_August_2007"> </div id>

25 August 2007 (Saturday)

Basketball
FIBA Africa Championship 2007 at Angola
Final:  86–72 
FIBA Americas Championship 2007 at Las Vegas
Group A:  82–79 
Group A:  104–83 
Group B:  113–63 
Group B:  93–89 
Auto racing:
NASCAR: Sharpie 500 in Bristol, Tennessee.
(1) Carl Edwards (2) Kasey Kahne (3) Clint Bowyer
Edwards wins his second race of the season, and clinches a spot in the Chase for the NEXTEL Cup. Matt Kenseth and Tony Stewart also clinch spots in the Chase.
Cricket:
South African cricket team in Zimbabwe in 2007
 251/2 (39.1 overs) beat  247/7 (50 overs) by 8 wickets

<div id="24_August_2007"> </div id>

24 August 2007 (Friday)

National Football League
The National Football League suspends Atlanta Falcons quarterback Michael Vick indefinitely and without pay after his guilty plea to criminal charges stemming from a dogfighting ring.
Cricket:
Indian cricket team in England in 2007
 329/7 (50 ov.) beat  320/8 by 9 runs.
India and England are tied 1–1 with 5 to play.
Dimitri Mascarenhas scores his first ODI fifty
Basketball:
FIBA Oceania Championship 2007 at Australia
Non-bearing game:  67–58 
FIBA Africa Championship 2007 at Angola
3rd place:  53–51 
5th place:  83–82 
FIBA Americas Championship 2007 at Las Vegas
Group A:  95–90 
Group A:  87–75 
Group B:  93–83 
Group B:  101–75 

<div id="23_August_2007"> </div id>

23 August 2007 (Thursday)

Basketball:
FIBA Americas Championship 2007 at Las Vegas
Group A:  90–69 
Group A:  108–67 
Group B:  80–73 
Group B:  123–59 
FIBA Africa Championship 2007 at Angola
Semifinals
 93–60 
 58–52 
Classification games
7th place:  69–63 
9th place:  79–68 
11th place:  78–74 
13th place:  97–85 
15th place:  92–84 

<div id="22_August_2007"> </div id>

22 August 2007 (Wednesday)

Football (soccer) 2008 UEFA European Football Championship qualifying
Group A:  2–1 
Group A:  3–2 
Group A:  1–1 
Group D:  0–1 
Group E:  2–1 
Group F:  3–1 
Cricket
South African cricket team in Zimbabwe in 2007
 210/5 (46.5 ov.) beat  206 (50 ov.) by 5 wickets
Basketball:
FIBA Oceania Championship 2007 at Australia
 93–67 , Australia win best-of-3 series, 2–0, and clinch a berth in the 2008 Olympic tournament.
FIBA Americas Championship 2007 at Las Vegas
Group A:  88–84 (OT) 
Group A:  100–89 
Group B:  75–67 
Group B:  112–69 
Major League Baseball:
In the first game of a doubleheader, the Texas Rangers set a modern-era (post-1900) MLB single-game record by scoring 30 runs in a 30–3 rout of the Baltimore Orioles at Oriole Park at Camden Yards.  With a 9–7 victory in the second game, the Rangers also set the record for runs by a single team in a doubleheader, with 39.  It is the first time a team has scored at least 30 runs since 1897.

<div id="21_August_2007"> </div id>

21 August 2007 (Tuesday)

Auto racing:
NASCAR: 3M Performance 400 in Brooklyn, Michigan (postponed from August 19 due to rain).
(1) Kurt Busch (2) Martin Truex Jr. (3) Jimmie Johnson
Kurt Busch wins in a green-white-checker finish after Greg Biffle spun out with two laps remaining.  Jeff Gordon and Denny Hamlin became the first to clinch spots in the Chase for the NEXTEL Cup.

NFL:
The Kansas City Chiefs and running back Larry Johnson agreed to a five-year, $43.2 million (US) contract.
College football:
After seven decades playing in the Orange Bowl, the University of Miami (Florida) Hurricanes will move after the 2007 season to Dolphin Stadium in nearby Miami Gardens, Florida. (AP via ESPN.com)
Cricket
Indian cricket team in England in 2007
 288/2 (50 ov.) beat  184 (50 ov.) by 104 runs
Basketball: FIBA Africa Championship 2007 quarterfinals at Angola
<div id="20_August_2007"> </div id>

20 August 2007 (Monday)

National Football League:
The lead attorney for Atlanta Falcons quarterback Michael Vick announces that Vick will plead guilty in a plea bargain to federal charges stemming from an investigation into his dog fighting activities. (Fox News (USA))
Major League Baseball:
Against the Kansas City Royals, Chicago White Sox closer Bobby Jenks gives up a single to the first batter he faces, Joey Gathright. The hit ends Jenks' streak of consecutive batters retired at 41. Jenks, who had not allowed a base runner since July 17, remains tied with Jim Barr for the Major League record for consecutive batters retired. Jenks picks up the save in the Sox' 4–3 win.

<div id="19_August_2007"> </div id>

19 August 2007 (Sunday)

Baseball:
Minnesota Twins pitcher Johan Santana strikes out 17 batters in eight innings against the Texas Rangers to set a franchise record for strikeouts in a game. Twins closer Joe Nathan adds two strikeouts in the ninth and combines with Santana in a two-hit shutout. Minnesota wins, 1–0. (AP via Yahoo)

<div id="18_August_2007"> </div id>

18 August 2007 (Saturday)

Softball: 2007 Junior League World Series at Kirkland, Washington:
 Maunabo, Puerto Rico def.  Westchester–Del Rey, California 16–6.
Baseball: 2007 Junior League World Series at Taylor, Michigan:
 Pearl City, Hawaii def.  Makati, Philippines 6–2.
Basketball: FIBA Oceania Championship 2007 at Australia
 79–67 , Australia leads best-of-3 series, 1–0.

<div id="17_August_2007"> </div id>

17 August 2007 (Friday)

<div id="16_August_2007"> </div id>

16 August 2007 (Thursday)

<div id="15_August_2007"> </div id>

15 August 2007 (Wednesday)

Basketball
Referee Tim Donaghy pleads guilty to two federal charges related to the investigation regarding betting on NBA games. (USA Today)(History and the Headlines)

<div id="14_August_2007"> </div id>

14 August 2007 (Tuesday)

Baseball:
Atlanta Braves manager Bobby Cox is ejected in the fifth inning of the Braves' 5–4 win over the San Francisco Giants. The ejection is the 132nd of Cox's career, breaking the record set by John McGraw more than 70 years ago. (AP via Yahoo)

<div id="13_August_2007"> </div id>

13 August 2007 (Monday)

Baseball:
Hall of Fame member and longtime New York Yankees shortstop and announcer Phil Rizzuto dies at the age of 89 in a nursing home in West Orange, New Jersey. (AP via Yahoo)
Cricket:
Indian cricket team in England in 2007
3rd Test-5th Day: 664 & 180/6 (dec) drew  345 & 369/6 (110 ov.)
 win the Test series 1–0.
This is India's first Test series win in England since 1986.
this is England's first home test series loss since 2001 against the Australians.
2007–08 ICC Intercontinental Cup
 183 lead  152/0 (37 ov.) by 31 runs

<div id="12_August_2007"> </div id>

12 August 2007 (Sunday)

Golf: PGA Championship
Tiger Woods wins his 13th major championship by 2 strokes, over Woody Austin, with a four-day total of 272 (−8).
Auto racing:
NASCAR: Centurion Boats at The Glen in Watkins Glen, New York.
(1) Tony Stewart (2) Denny Hamlin (3) Jimmie Johnson
Stewart takes advantage of a spinout by leader Jeff Gordon with two laps remaining to win.
Champ Car: Grand Prix of Road America in Elkhart Lake, Wisconsin, USA.
(1) Sébastien Bourdais  (2) Dan Clarke  (3) Graham Rahal 
Cricket:
Indian cricket team in England in 2007
3rd Test-4th Day: 664 & 180/6 (dec) lead  345 & 56/0 (20 ov.) by 444 runs
2007–08 ICC Intercontinental Cup
 473/7 (110 ov.) drew  314
Points:Ireland 9,Scotland 3.
Major League Baseball
Detroit Tigers right fielder Magglio Ordóñez hits two home runs in the same inning, part of an eight-run second inning that propelled the Tigers to an 11–6 victory over the Oakland Athletics.  He led off the second inning with a solo home run, then hit a three-run home run on his second at-bat of the inning.  He is the second Tiger to accomplish the feat—the first was hall-of-famer Al Kaline, who did it in 1955 against the Athletics (who represented Kansas City at the time).  For the game, Ordóñez went 2-for-3 with 2 walks.

<div id="11_August_2007"> </div id>

11 August 2007 (Saturday)

Auto racing:
IRL: Meijer Indy 300 in Sparta, Kentucky.
(1) Tony Kanaan  (2) Scott Dixon  (3) A. J. Foyt IV 
Cricket:
Indian cricket team in England in 2007
3rd Test-3rd Day: 664 lead  326/9 (96 ov.) by 338 runs
2007–08 ICC Intercontinental Cup
 314 leads  179/4 (44 ov.) by 135 runs.
No play on day 3.
Football:
Opening Day of the 2007–08 English Premier League season.
Golf: PGA Championship
Sergio García is disqualified after signing an incorrect scorecard following the 3rd round.  The scorecard, kept by playing partner Boo Weekley, showed a par 4 on the 17th hole, but his actual score was a 5.  Tiger Woods held a 3 stroke lead, over Stephen Ames, with a three-day total of 203(−7).
Rugby union: 2007 Rugby World Cup warm-ups
 15–21  at Twickenham, London
 31–21 Ireland  at Murrayfield, Edinburgh

<div id="10_August_2007"> </div id>

10 August 2007 (Friday)

Cricket:
Indian cricket team in England in 2007
3rd Test-2nd Day: 664 lead  24/1 (8 ov.) by 640 runs
Anil Kumble scores his maiden test century.
2007–08 ICC Intercontinental Cup
 314 leads  179/4 (44 ov.) by 135 runs

<div id="9_August_2007"> </div id>

9 August 2007 (Thursday)

Cricket:
Indian cricket team in England in 2007
3rd Test-1st Day: 316/4 (90 ov.) lead  by 316 runs
2007–08 ICC Intercontinental Cup
 183/7 (101 ov.) leads  by 183 runs

<div id="8_August_2007"> </div id>

8 August 2007 (Wednesday)

<div id="7_August_2007"> </div id>

7 August 2007 (Tuesday)

Tennis:
East West Bank Classic WTA Tournament
Sania Mirza beat Martina Hingis 6–2, 2–6, 6–4 to enter the quarterfinals of the event.
Cricket
Twenty20 World Championship
Lalchand Rajput appointed manager of Indian team for the championship.
Baseball:
Barry Bonds home run chase
Bonds hits his 756th career home run in the fifth inning of the San Francisco Giants' game against the Washington Nationals at AT&T Park. Bonds hits the 435-foot shot to right-center field against pitcher Mike Bacsik in the bottom of the fifth inning with one out at 8:51 PM PDT to pass Hank Aaron. Bonds was greeted at home plate by his family, his teammates, and his godfather, Willie Mays.  The AT&T Park video board then displayed a videotaped message of congratulations from Aaron, who had earlier expressed disinterest in Bonds' chase. The Nationals, though, came back and won the game by a score of 8–6.
The man who caught the historic ball was identified as Matt Murphy, a 22-year-old from Queens, New York who is a fan of the New York Mets and was on a stopover en route to Australia. Murphy caught the ball, survived a near-riot and was given a police escort. (Newsday.com)

<div id="6_August_2007"> </div id>

6 August 2007 (Monday)

Cricket
Twenty20 World Championship: Indian squad announced. Mahendra Singh Dhoni named captain. Yusuf Pathan given chance.
Indian cricket team in England in 2007: Indian squad announced. Rahul Dravid named captain. Munaf Patel recalled and Sreesanth left out.

<div id="5_August_2007"> </div id>

5 August 2007 (Sunday)

Baseball: New York Mets pitcher Tom Glavine wins his 300th game, giving up two runs on six hits in 6⅓ innings in the Mets' 8–3 win over the Chicago Cubs. He is the 23rd — and perhaps last — pitcher to reach the milestone. (AP via Yahoo)
Auto racing:
Formula One: Hungarian Grand Prix in Budapest, Hungary.
(1) Lewis Hamilton  (2) Kimi Räikkönen  (3) Nick Heidfeld 
NASCAR: Pennsylvania 500 in Long Pond, Pennsylvania.
(1) Kurt Busch (2) Dale Earnhardt Jr. (3) Denny Hamlin
IRL: Firestone Indy 400 in Brooklyn, Michigan.
(1) Tony Kanaan  (2) Marco Andretti  (3) Scott Sharp 
Football (soccer):
FA Community Shield:
Manchester United 1–1 Chelsea, Manchester United win 3–0 on penalties.
Women's Golf:
Lorena Ochoa wins the Women's British Open at the Old Course at St Andrews for her first major championship.  Ochoa shot +1 for a 4-day total of 287 (−5) and a 4 stroke victory over Jee Young Lee and Maria Hjorth.
Basketball:
FIBA Asia Championship Final round at Tokushima, Japan:
7th place:  86–82 
5th place:  97–74 
3rd place:  80–76 
Final:  74–69 
FIBA Under-19 World Championship for Women at Bratislava, Slovakia:
Final:  99–57 

<div id="4_August_2007"> </div id>

4 August 2007 (Saturday)

Major League Baseball:
 Barry Bonds ties Hank Aaron as the all-time leader with 755 home runs to lead off the 2nd inning against the San Diego Padres' Clay Hensley.
 Alex Rodriguez becomes the youngest player in MLB history to hit 500 career home runs at 32 years and 8 days in a 16–8 victory by the New York Yankees over the Kansas City Royals.
Basketball:
FIBA Asia Championship at Tokushima, Japan:
Classification games:
15th place:  82–77 
13th place:  72–66 
11th place:  108–79 
9th place:  78–76 
Semifinals:
 76–74  – Fadi El Khatib top-scored with 32 points as Korea turned the ball over on their last two possessions to halt their own run.
 75–62  – The Kazakhs were daunted with 7–26 first quarter score to prevent further incursions.
Rugby union: 2007 Rugby World Cup warm-ups
 62–5  at Twickenham, London
 70–14  at CASI, Buenos Aires
Cricket:
2007–08 ICC Intercontinental Cup
 452 beat  255 & 138 by an innings and 59 runs
Swimming:
Dara Torres wins the 50-meter freestyle competition at the 2007 United States National Swimming Championships, becoming, at age 40, the oldest American to win a championship in US history.

<div id="3_August_2007"> </div id>

3 August 2007 (Friday)

Major League Baseball
Detroit Tigers infielder Neifi Pérez is suspended for 80 games by Major League Baseball for failing a third drug test.

<div id="2_August_2007"> </div id>

2 August 2007 (Thursday)

Basketball:
FIBA Asia Championship quarterfinals at Tokushima, Japan:
Group E:  87–74 
Group E:  82–60 
Lebanon wins group E; both teams advance to the semifinals.
Group F:  75–73  – Clutch free-throws by Anton Ponomarev kept the Kazakhs in contention.
With Japan's defeat of Jordan, both Kazakhstan and Korea advance to the semifinals.
Group F:  71–68  – Jordan's Rashiem Wright missed a three-pointer that could've put the game into overtime.
Jordan is eliminated from championship contention.
Major League Baseball
A game between the Minnesota Twins and the Kansas City Royals scheduled for today at the Hubert H. Humphrey Metrodome in Minneapolis, is postponed due to the collapse of the I-35W Mississippi River bridge. The game the previous day began less than an hour after the actual collapse, but officials told the Twins to proceed with that game because cancelling would have sent thousands of vehicles onto the roads and hampered rescue efforts.  The groundbreaking ceremony for the new Twins ballpark has also been postponed. (ESPN)

<div id="1_August_2007"> </div id>

1 August 2007 (Wednesday)

Basketball:
FIBA Asia Championship quarterfinals at Tokushima, Japan:
Group E:  95–64 
Group E:  95–87 
Lebanon and Iran advance to the semifinals.
Qatar and Chinese Taipei are eliminated from championship contention.
Group F:  82–73 
Group F:  93–83 
Japan is eliminated from championship contention.

References

08